Moneyslane Football Club is an intermediate football club from Moneyslane, County Down, Northern Ireland. They play in the Intermediate A Division of the Mid-Ulster Football League. Home games are played at Jubilee Park, otherwise known as the "Back Front garden" Moneyslane. They currently have two senior men’s teams, a Ladies team and a junior section.

References

External links

Association football clubs in Northern Ireland
Association football clubs in County Down
Mid-Ulster Football League clubs
1983 establishments in Northern Ireland